A. Manjunath is an Indian politician. He was elected to the Karnataka Legislative Assembly  from Magadi in 2018 Karnataka Legislative Assembly Election and won by a margin of 51,425 votes.

References

Janata Dal (Secular) politicians
Janata Dal politicians
Karnataka MLAs 2018–2023
1973 births
Living people